In marketing, the whole product concept is an adaptation of the total product concept developed by Ted Levitt, a professor at Harvard Business School. In his book entitled “The Marketing Imagination” Levitt drew attention to the fact that consumers purchase more than the core product itself. Rather, they purchase the core product combined with complimentary attributes, the majority of which are intangible.

The total product was Levitt’s vision of how intangible elements could be added to a physical product, transforming it into an offering that was often more valuable than the physical attributes alone.

Following the insights provided by Ted Levitt, Regis McKenna renamed the total product concept, calling it the "whole product" which he defined as a generic or core product, augmented by everything that is needed for the customer to have a compelling reason to buy.

The total product concept was also refined by Tom Peters. In a 1986 publication entitled "The Eye of the Beholder", Peters proposed an extension to Levitt’s total product concept that describes the discrepancy between insider and customer perceptions in three different types of industries.

Another framework was suggested by Warren Schirtzinger called The Low Risk Recipe. Schirtzinger organizes intangible product attributes into three groups that surround the core innovation, and act to lower the end user's perception of risk and encourage the adoption of a new innovation;

End User Harmony - "product attributes that allow customers to continue using existing systems and methods and minimize change while allowing the exploration and testing of a new innovation"

Category Cooperation - "product attributes that reflect the supplier's credibility and commitment to a market category mostly through adherence to industry standards, complimentary products and intellectual property"

Safety in Numbers - "systems that support product adoption by acting as external safeguards through the establishment of end-user communities and an independent, long-term support infrastructure"

See also
Marketing
Empathic design
Product (business)

References

Product management